The Ruthless is a 2019 Italian-French crime drama film directed by Renato De Maria and starring Riccardo Scamarcio. The film premiered in Italy on 8 April 2019, and was released on Netflix on 19 April 2019.

Cast 
 Riccardo Scamarcio as Santo Russo
 Sara Serraiocco as Mariangela
 Alessio Praticò as Salvatore 'Slim' Mammone
 Alessandro Tedeschi as Mario Barbieri
 Marie-Ange Casta as Annabelle
 Sara Cardinaletti as Suor Giuseppina
 Angelo Libri as Pantaleone Russo
 Adele Tirante as Caterina Russo
 Michele De Virgilio as Avvocato Giovanni Bova
 Aram Kian as Nuri
 Sebastian Gimelli Morosini as Giampi
 Pietro Pace as Spadafora
 Fabio Pellicori as Ciccio Gaetani
 Giuseppe Percoco as Paolino Gaetani
 Marco Ripoldi as Cameriere

References

External links 
 
 
 

2019 crime drama films
2019 films
Films about organized crime in Italy
Films set in Milan
French crime drama films
Italian crime drama films
2010s Italian-language films
Italian-language Netflix original films
2010s French films